James Addison Young (21 January 1815 – 9 March 1875) was an American politician.

Young was born on 21 January 1815 in Rockbridge County, Virginia, to a family of Scots-Irish descent. He was the seventh of eight siblings. Young worked on a farm as a child, and later learned to make saddles and harnesses from John A. Wolfley in Circleville, Ohio. Young moved through Ohio, Indiana, Illinois, and Kentucky, before settling in Oskaloosa, Iowa in October 1849. Between 1850 and 1858, he ran a store. 

Young supported the Whig Party until its dissolution, when he joined the Republican Party. Between 1861 and January 1872, Young served as Mahaska County treasurer. He won the District 18 seat in the Iowa Senate in the 1871 election and remained in office until his death on 9 March 1875.

References

County treasurers in Iowa
Iowa Whigs
19th-century American merchants
1875 deaths
Businesspeople from Iowa
Saddle manufacturers
Iowa state senators
19th-century American politicians
People from Oskaloosa, Iowa
People from Rockbridge County, Virginia
1815 births
American people of Scotch-Irish descent
Iowa Republicans